Henry Forrest may refer to:

 Henry Forrest (martyr) (died 1533), Scottish martyr
 Henry Forrest (racehorse trainer) (1907–1975), American racehorse trainer
 Henry Garnet Forrest (1895–1945), Australian-born aviator